Christopher O'Connell was the defending champion but chose not to defend his title.

Bernabé Zapata Miralles won the title after defeating Carlos Alcaraz 6–2, 4–6, 6–2 in the final.

Seeds

Draw

Finals

Top half

Bottom half

References

External links
Main draw
Qualifying draw

Internazionali di Tennis del Friuli Venezia Giulia - Singles
2020 Singles
Friuli